Farsund Hospital was a local hospital situated close to the town centre of Farsund in Norway. It closed in 2007 and the municipality bought the property in December 2008. It has been disused since.

It was operated by the municipality until the health care reform of 2003, when it came under the regional Sørlandet sykehus HF system.

The hospital had a fine reputation for osteopathic medicine, according to Svein Mathisen, who had an ankle operation there in December 1983.

The maternity ward closed in 1993 and the surgical department in 1996. In 1998 there were 70 employees. On 30 June 2005 the polyclinic, radiology, and laboratory departments closed, and the hospital stopped operating 24 hours a day. Many employees were transferred to other hospitals. In 2005 there were 55 employees. The hospital closed in October 2007 when the paediatric and youth psychiatry department moved out. The municipality of Farsund had the right of first refusal on the hospital under a 1955 agreement; on 15 December 2008 they bought it from Sørlandet sykehus, planning to use it to offer private health services such as radiography. The old X-ray equipment was donated to a hospital in Zimbabwei.

In late 2012 the municipality decided to sell the building, but it must first be rezoned so that it can be used for purposes other than health care. In May 2013 the municipality published planning documents under which the site is to be used for high-density housing.

References

Hospital buildings completed in 1937
Hospitals disestablished in 2007
Defunct hospitals
Farsund
Hospitals in Norway